Najee Dorsey (born 1973) is a contemporary American visual artist known for using mixed-media, collage, paint and photographic works that depict Southern African American experience and culture.

Biography 
Najee Dorsey was born Jan. 26, 1973 in Blytheville, Arkansas. He began creating art from a young age, but in 2005 became a full-time artist after a move to Atlanta, Georgia. His art can be seen in various art institutions and private collections across the United States. In 2010, Dorsey created Black Art in America (BAIA), a media web site that provides access and exposure to black art and artists and facilitates connections between artists, collectors and art enthusiasts. Dorsey and his wife, Seteria Dorsey (also a visual artist, and his business partner), live in Columbus, Georgia.

Career 
Najee Dorsey has used collage to convey the experience of growing up in the South, including his own childhood in Mississippi County, Arkansas. His art has consisted of painting, photographs, digital and mixed media forms. Dorsey creates collages that focus on Southern African American culture. His art has been known to highlight such themes as the Blues, black people within United States history and socioeconomic conditions of the South. His newest work, titled The Poor People's Campaign (an homage to Martin Luther King's program for economic justice) focuses on the themes of afrofuturism and environmental racism in poor communities in the South.

Exhibitions 
Dorsey has exhibited his work at many galleries and institutions, including:

 Anika Dawkins Gallery, Atlanta, Georgia (2021)
 Griots Gallery, Miami, Florida (2020) 
 Columbus Liberty Theatre, Columbus, Georgia (2019)
 Mildred L. Terry Library, Columbus, Georgia (2019)
 Stonecrest Library, Lithonia, Georgia, The Art of Najee Dorsey: Environmental Injustice, Visions of a Futuristic Black South (2019)
 Pennsylvania Academy of the Fine Arts, Philadelphia, Pennsylvania, R.D.’s Backroom
 University of Arkansas Library, Fayetteville, Arkansas, Remixed: Something Ole, Sum Nu Roux (2016);
 The American Jazz Museum, Kansas City, Missouri, Jazz Then and Now (2015)
 Syracuse University, Community Folk Art Center, Resistance (2015)
 The Houston Museum of African American Culture, Leaving Mississippi: Reflections on Heroes and Folklore (2015)
 The Columbus Museum, Columbus, Georgia, Leaving Mississippi: Reflections on Heroes and Folklore (2014)
The Charles H. Wright Museum of African American History, Detroit, Michigan, Visions of the 44th Collection (2012)

Selected works 
B-4-Rosa-Here I Stand (2014)
Baby Boy (2019)
Bethlehem Steele (2015)
Captive Audience (2019)
Deacons for Defense (2011)
Harriet’s Daughter (2018)

Further reading 
Art and Public History: Approaches, Opportunities, and Challenges, edited by Rebecca Bush and K. Tawny Paul

Cool Jobs: ‘Artrepreneur’ Uses Web to Expose World to Artists of Color

References

External links 
Black Art in America

1973 births
Living people
21st-century male artists
African-American artists
People from Blytheville, Arkansas
21st-century African-American people
20th-century African-American people